Babinops is an extinct genus of trilobite in the family Phacopidae.

References

Phacopidae
Articles created by Qbugbot